is a former Japanese football player.

Club statistics
Updated to 28 October 2018.

References

External links

Profile at J. League

1993 births
Living people
Association football people from Ehime Prefecture
Japanese footballers
J2 League players
Fagiano Okayama players
Association football defenders